The paper plane is an IBA official cocktail. Developed around 2007 by Sasha Petraske and Sam Ross of Milk & Honey for their former colleague Toby Maloney's Chicago bar The Violet Hour. The recipe is a riff on a last word, which is a riff on the classic corpse reviver #2. The cocktail consists of equal parts bourbon whiskey, Aperol, Amaro Nonino, and lemon juice. The cocktail's name is a reference to the M.I.A. track "Paper Planes", which was apparently a guilty pleasure of Petraske's.

See also
 List of cocktails

References

Cocktails with whisky